Burnside Township may refer to:
 Burnside Township, Webster County, Iowa
 Burnside Township, Michigan
 Burnside Township, Clearfield County, Pennsylvania
 Burnside Township, Centre County, Pennsylvania

Township name disambiguation pages